Regina Sterz (March 23, 1985) is a retired female skier from Austria. She represented Austria in the woman's downhill event in the 2010 Winter Olympics, in which she came 14th.

She has competed in hundreds of International Ski Federation events since 2003, eleven of which she won.

References

External links
 Regina Sterz at www.vancouver2010.com

1985 births
Living people
Alpine skiers at the 2010 Winter Olympics
Austrian female alpine skiers
Olympic alpine skiers of Austria
Alpine skiers at the 2014 Winter Olympics